Asher Creek is a stream in Greene and Polk counties of southwest Missouri. It is a tributary of the Little Sac River.

The stream flows north to northwest passing under Route AC and past Cave Spring and on passing west of Sacville and under Route BB to enter Polk County and its confluence with the Little Sac River southwest of Morrisville.
Asher Creek has the name of Samuel Asher, a pioneer citizen.

See also
List of rivers of Missouri

References

Rivers of Greene County, Missouri
Rivers of Polk County, Missouri
Rivers of Missouri